Ab-e Garm (also Romanized as Āb-e Garm; also known as Ab Garm Nazdike Bahram Abad) is a village in Ganjabad Rural District, Esmaili District, Anbarabad County, Kerman Province, Iran. At the 2006 census, its population was 33, in 6 families.

References 

Populated places in Anbarabad County